Monterey Bay is a bay of the Pacific Ocean located on the coast of the U.S. state of California, south of the San Francisco Bay Area and its major city at the south of the bay, San Jose. San Francisco itself is further north along the coast, by about 75 miles, accessible via Highway 1 and Highway 280.

Santa Cruz is located at the north end of the bay, and Monterey is on the Monterey Peninsula at the south end. The "Monterey Bay Area" is a local colloquialism sometimes used to describe the whole of the Central Coast communities of Santa Cruz and Monterey counties.

Toponymy

The first European to discover Monterey Bay was Juan Rodríguez Cabrillo on November 16, 1542, while sailing northward along the coast on a Spanish naval expedition. He named the bay Bahía de los Pinos, probably because of the forest of pine trees first encountered while rounding the peninsula at the southern end of the bay. Cabrillo's name for the bay was lost, but the westernmost point of the peninsula is still known as Point Pinos.

On December 10, 1595, Sebastián Rodríguez Cermeño crossed the bay and bestowed the name Bahía de San Pedro in honor of Saint Peter Martyr.

The present name for the bay was given in 1602 by Sebastián Vizcaíno, who had been tasked by the Spanish government to complete a detailed chart of the coast. On December 16, 1602 he rounded a large peninsula and entered a bay that he named Puerto de Monterrey in honor of Don Gaspár de Zúñiga y Acevedo, 5th Count of Monterrey, who was governor of New Spain and had dispatched the expedition. Monterrey is an alternate spelling of Monterrei, a municipality in the Galicia region of Spain from which the viceroy and his father (the Fourth Count of Monterrei) originated.

All other place names in the vicinity containing Monterey were so named because of their proximity to the bay. This includes the Presidio of Monterey, City of Monterey, County of Monterey and Monterey Canyon.

Geology

The Monterey Canyon, one of the largest underwater canyons in the world, begins off the coast of Moss Landing, in the center of Monterey Bay. The canyon is much like that of a continental slope; the biology of the canyon changes significantly in different parts of the canyon.

Flora and fauna
Monterey Bay is home to many species of marine mammals, including sea otters, harbor seals, and bottlenose dolphins; as well as being on the migratory path of gray and humpback whales and a breeding site for elephant seals. Killer whales are also found along the coast, especially when gray whales migrate, as they hunt the whales during their migration north.  Many species of fish, sharks, mollusks such as abalone and squid, birds, and sea turtles also live in the bay. Several varieties of kelp grow in the bay, some becoming as tall as trees, forming what is known as a kelp forest.

Marine protected areas
Soquel Canyon State Marine Conservation Area, Portuguese Ledge State Marine Conservation Area, Pacific Grove Marine Gardens State Marine Conservation Area, Lovers Point State Marine Reserve, Edward F. Ricketts State Marine Conservation Area and Asilomar State Marine Reserve are marine protected areas in Monterey Bay.  Like underwater parks, these marine protected areas help conserve ocean wildlife and marine ecosystems.

Communities around Monterey Bay

Clockwise around the bay, generally from north to south.  Inland communities are indented:
Santa Cruz
Live Oak
Capitola
Soquel
Aptos
Rio del Mar
La Selva Beach
Corralitos
Freedom
Watsonville
Pajaro
Las Lomas
Elkhorn
Moss Landing
Castroville
Salinas
Marina
Seaside
Fort Ord
Sand City
Del Rey Oaks
Monterey
New Monterey
Pacific Grove
Carmel
Carmel Valley
Carmel Highlands

In popular culture 

Apple's desktop operating system, macOS Monterey, is named after this region.

Gallery

See also
California State University, Monterey Bay
Monterey Bay Aquarium

References

Further reading

External links

Live Monterey Bay Web Cam
Monterey Bay National Marine Sanctuary website

 
Bays of California
Bays of the Pacific Ocean
Bodies of water of Monterey County, California
Bodies of water of Santa Cruz County, California
Regions of California
Geography of Northern California
Geography of Monterey County, California
Geography of San Benito County, California
Geography of Santa Cruz County, California
Birdwatching sites in the United States
Northern California
Tourism regions of California